Downriver is the third solo (studio) album by Karen Matheson, lead singer of the Scottish band Capercaillie.

Track listing
 "Chi Mi Bhuam" (I See Afar) – 4:27
 "Cronan Bleoghainn" – 5:01
"Cronan Bleoghainn"
"'S moch an diugh gun d'rinn mi eirigh"
 "Gleann Baille Chaoil" – 4:26
 "I Will Not Wear the Willow" – 5:35
 "O Mhairi's Tu Mo Mhairi" -  5:08
"O Mhairi's Tu Mo Mhairi (Mary, You Are My Mary)"
"Riobainean Riomhach (Gorgeous Ribbons)"
 "Laoidh Fhearchair Eòghainn" – 3:36
 "O Nach Éisdeadh" – 4:05
O Nach Éisdeadh Tu'n Sgeul le Aire (Oh that You Would Listen to the Tale Attentively)
 "Singing in the Dark" – 3:25
 "Puirt A Beul" (Mouthmusic) – 3:45
 "Luadh An Toraidh" (Harvest Waulking) – 3:18
 "Crucán Na bPáiste" (Burial Place of the Children) - 5:12

References

Karen Matheson albums
2005 albums